The Okinawa diet describes the eating habits of the indigenous people of the Ryukyu Islands (belonging to Japan), which is believed to contribute to their exceptional longevity. It is also the name of a weight-loss diet based on this.

Longevity
People from the Ryukyu Islands (of which Okinawa is the largest) have a life expectancy among the highest in the world, although the male life expectancy rank among Japanese prefectures has plummeted in recent years.

Okinawa had the longest life expectancy in all prefectures of Japan for almost 30 years prior to 2000.  The relative life expectancy of Okinawans has since declined, due to many factors including westernization. In fact, in 2000 Okinawa dropped in its ranking for longevity advantage for men to 26th out of 47 within the prefectures of Japan.

Japan has the highest life expectancy of any country: 90 for women and for men, 84.

There are more than 400 centenarians in Okinawa. Although there are myriad factors that could account for differences in life expectancy, cuisine could be the largest factor. People from all around the world have tried to emulate the "Okinawa diet" to reap its health benefits, believed to be because it is nutritionally dense yet low in calories.

Indigenous islanders' diet 

The traditional diet of the islanders contains 30% green and yellow vegetables. Although the traditional Japanese diet usually includes large quantities of rice, the traditional Okinawa diet consists of smaller quantities of rice; instead the staple is the purple-fleshed Okinawan sweet potato.  The Okinawan diet has only 30% of the sugar and 15% of the grains of the average Japanese dietary intake.

Okinawan cuisine consists of smaller meal portions of green and yellow vegetables, fish, relatively smaller amounts of rice compared to mainland Japan, as well as pork, soy and other legumes. Pork and fish are often served in broth with a variety of ingredients and herbs. The center of the Okinawa diet is the Satsuma sweet potato. The sweet potato also contributes to the self-sufficiency of the island. Contrary to the regular potato, the Okinawa sweet potato does not have a large effect on blood sugar. Not only is the potato used but so are the leaves from the plant. The leaves are used often in miso soup. The Okinawan bitter melon is proven to have some anti-diabetic effects. In Okinawa the bitter melon is called goyain and is served in the national dish, goya champuru. The bitter melon is effective in regulating blood sugar similar to the sweet potato.

The traditional diet also includes a tiny amount of fish (less than half a serving per day) and more in the way of soy and other legumes (6% of total caloric intake). Pork is highly valued, yet eaten very rarely.  Every part of the pig is eaten, including internal organs.

Between a sample from Okinawa where life expectancies at birth and 65 were the longest in Japan, and a sample from Akita Prefecture where the life expectancies were much shorter, intakes of calcium, and vitamins A, B1, B2, and C, and the proportion of energy from proteins and fats were significantly higher in Okinawa than in Akita. Conversely, intake of salt was lower in Okinawa than in Akita.

The small quantity of pork consumption per person (only 3g per day) in Okinawa is still larger than that of the Japanese national average. The pig's feet, ears, and stomach are considered healthy everyday foodstuffs.

The dietary intake of Okinawans compared to other Japanese circa 1950 shows that Okinawans consumed: fewer total calories (1785 vs. 2068), less polyunsaturated fat (4.8% of calories vs. 8%), less rice (154g vs. 328g), significantly less wheat, barley and other grains (38g vs. 153g), less sugars (3g vs. 8g), more legumes (71g vs. 55g), significantly less fish (15g vs. 62g), significantly less meat and poultry (3g vs. 11g), less eggs (1g vs. 7g), less dairy (<1g vs. 8g), much more sweet potatoes (849g vs. 66g), less other potatoes (2g vs. 47g), less fruit (<1g vs. 44g), and no pickled vegetables (0g vs. 42g).
 In short, the Okinawans circa 1950 ate sweet potatoes for 849 grams of the 1262 grams of food that they consumed, which constituted 69% of their total calories.

In addition to their high life expectancy, islanders are noted for their low mortality from cardiovascular disease and certain types of cancers. Wilcox (2007) compared age-adjusted mortality of Okinawans versus Americans and found that, during 1995, an average Okinawan was 8 times less likely to die from coronary heart disease, 7 times less likely to die from prostate cancer, 6.5 times less likely to die from breast cancer, and 2.5 times less likely to die from colon cancer than an average American of the same age.

The traditional Okinawan diet as described above was widely practiced on the islands until about the 1960s. Since then, dietary practices have been shifting towards Western and Japanese patterns, with fat intake rising from about 6% to 27% of total caloric intake and the sweet potato being supplanted with rice and bread. This shifting trend has also coincided with a decrease in longevity, where Okinawans now have a lower life expectancy than the Japanese average.

Another low-calorie staple in Okinawa is seaweed, particularly, konbu or kombu. This plant, like much of the greenery from the island, is rich in protein, amino acids and minerals such as iodine. Another seaweed commonly eaten is wakame. Like konbu, wakame is rich in minerals like iodine, magnesium and calcium. Seaweed and tofu in one form or other are eaten on a daily basis.

Turmeric is prevalent in the Okinawan diet. It has been noted throughout history, especially in South Asia for its supposed health benefits. The Okinawan use turmeric as a spice and also as tea.

Overall, the diet leads to many benefits seen among people of Okinawa. These include little weight gain with age, low BMI throughout life, and low risk from age related disease. Not only is the diet healthy in preventing disease, many of the foodstuffs contain combative ingredients as well. As mentioned earlier the diet is rich in ingredients that supposedly possess anti-aging and antioxidant properties. However, no ingredients or foods of any kind have ever been scientifically shown to possess anti-aging properties. Research using 100 items from the Okinawa diet shows that some of the diet contains anti-obesity properties or "anti-obese activity".

Weight loss diet 
The diet consists of a relatively high energy intake, and contains similar foods to the traditional Okinawan diet. The principal focus of the diet consists of knowing the food energy density of each food item.

The proponents of this diet divide food into four categories based on caloric density.

Research 
Caloric restriction (CR) or dietary restriction (DR) are helpful tools in understanding age and diet related health complications. In the 1972 Japan National Nutrition Survey it was determined that Okinawan adults consumed 83% of what Japanese adults did and that Okinawan children consumed 62% of what Japanese children consumed. Today the difference in life expectancy between Okinawan and mainland Japanese is decreasing as the Okinawan are losing their dietary advantage. Recently, there is a decreasing trend in the life expectancy in Okinawa. This is evidenced by low birth weight, poor lactation, and the fact that the life expectancy for Okinawan men is lower than the national average. Le Bourg poses that the Okinawa diet has more of a deleterious effect then beneficial one, arguing that the low protein intake can cause harmful effects in later generations. Research done on animals showed that individuals with a lower protein consumption may be more vulnerable to pathogens. However, Gavrilova and Gavrilov reject this claim, arguing that dietary restrictions are a valid method for humans to extend their lives and that Okinawa has a naturally low infectious load. They instead hypothesize that the decrease in life expectancy has been due to westernization and erosion of the traditional diet. After World War II, Okinawans started to consume more calories. This in large part was due to the Americanization of the diet, such as with the rapid spread of fast food places. The spread of primarily American fast food chains was linked with an increase in cardiovascular diseases, much like the ones noted in Japanese migrants to the United States.

Culture and customs 
Okinawa and Japan have food-centered cultures. Festivities often include food or are food-based. Moreover, the food in Japan tends to be seasonal, fresh and raw. Portion sizes are small and meals are brought out in stages that starts with appetizers, many main courses including sashimi (raw fish) and suimono (soup), sweets and tea. Since food culture is linked to ancestral traditions, the food culture and presentation is preserved, passing low-calorie food from generation to generation.  A belief still prevalent in Okinawa is the healing power of food. Food is regarded as medicine which helps contribute to the longevity of Okinawa. The concept of "food is medicine" came to the island from China.

See also 
 Calorie restriction
 Hara hachi bu
 List of diets
 Okinawan cuisine
 Mediterranean diet

References

Bibliography
 

Eating behaviors of humans
Diets
Gerontology
Nutrient-rich, low calorie diets